Jaroslav Kracík (born 18 January 1983) is a Czech professional ice hockey player. He was selected by the Columbus Blue Jackets in the 8th round (231st overall) of the 2002 NHL Entry Draft.

Kracík played with HC Litvínov in the Czech Extraliga during the 2010–11 season.

Career statistics

References

External links 
 

1983 births
BK Mladá Boleslav players
Columbus Blue Jackets draft picks
Czech ice hockey right wingers
EV Landshut players
HC Karlovy Vary players
HC Litvínov players
HC Plzeň players
HC Slovan Ústečtí Lvi players
HC Stadion Litoměřice players
IHC Písek players
Living people
SC Riessersee players
Sportspeople from Plzeň
Czech expatriate ice hockey players in Germany